Rock & Roll Rebels is the twelfth album by John Kay and Steppenwolf. It was released in 1987, as Qwil Catalog # NU 1560. The LP was distributed by Dominion Entertainment, Inc., and the CD and cassette were distributed by K-tel International (USA), Inc.

It was reissued in 1996 as Feed the Fire, in a remixed form on the Winter Harvest label. The reissue did not include "Turn Out The Lights" and "Give Me Life," but added two new songs, "Feed The Fire" and "Bad Attitude."

Track listing
Side one
"Give Me Life" (John Kay, Rocket Ritchotte, Michael Wilk) – 4:16 (*replaced by "Feed The Fire" in 1996 reissue)
"Rock & Roll Rebels" (Kay, Ritchotte, Wilk) – 4:00
"Hold On (Never Give Up, Never Give In)" (Kay, Ritchotte, Wilk) – 5:15
"Man On A Mission" (Kay, Wilk) – 4:01
"Everybody Knows You" (Kay, Wilk) – 3:22
Side two
"Rock Steady (I'm Rough and Ready)" (Kay, Wilk) – 3:52
"Replace the Face" (Alan O'Day) – 3:39
"Turn Out the Lights" (Kay, Raposa, Ritchotte) – 4:55 (*replaced by "Bad Attitude" in 1996 reissue)
"Give Me News I Can Use" (Kay) – 3:44
"Rage" (Kay, Ritchotte, Wilk) – 4:24

Personnel

Musicians
 John Kay – lead vocals, guitar
 Rocket Ritchotte – lead guitar, backing vocals
 Michael Wilk – keyboards, bass, programming
 Ron Hurst – drums, backing vocals

Technical
 Mike Reese – mastering
 Stanley Mouse - cover art
 Amy Epa – photography

Charts
Album – Billboard (United States)

References

Steppenwolf (band) albums
1987 albums
Albums produced by John Kay (musician)
Albums produced by Michael Wilk